Greatest Hits 1990–1995 is the second greatest hits compilation by American country music band Sawyer Brown. It features eight top 5 hits from four albums for Capitol/Curb: 1990's Buick, 1992's The Dirt Road and Cafe on the Corner, and 1993's Outskirts of Town. Two new tracks — "This Time" and "I Don't Believe in Goodbye" — are also included on this album. These songs were both released in 1995, peaking at #2 and #4, respectively, on the Billboard Hot Country Singles & Tracks (now Hot Country Songs) charts.

Track listing

Charts

Weekly charts

Year-end charts

Certifications

References

1995 greatest hits albums
Sawyer Brown compilation albums
Curb Records compilation albums
Albums produced by Mac McAnally